Pietro Fossati (29 June 1905 – 13 March 1945) was an Italian racing cyclist. He won the 1929 edition of the Giro di Lombardia.

References

External links
 

1905 births
1945 deaths
Italian male cyclists
People from Novi Ligure
Italian civilians killed in World War II
Deaths by airstrike during World War II
Cyclists from Piedmont
Sportspeople from the Province of Alessandria